The silvery lutung (Trachypithecus cristatus), also known as the silvered leaf monkey or the silvery langur, is an Old World monkey.  It is arboreal, living in coastal, mangrove, and riverine forests in Peninsular Malaysia, Sumatra, and Borneo.

It is the type of its species group.

Description
The silvery lutung is a medium-sized monkey with a long, non-prehensile tail. It has grey-tipped, dark brown or black fur, giving it a uniform silvery appearance. Unlike some related species, there are no paler markings on the face or body, except for a patch of whitish hair on the groin of females. A crest of fur runs along the top of the head, and the hair on the cheeks is long, often obscuring the ears. The hands and feet are hairless, with dark coloured skin, and have opposable thumbs and toes.

Like other langurs, the silvery lutung has a large three-chambered stomach to digest the cellulose found in its herbivorous diet. This allows for fermentation of food, and has some similarities with the stomach of ruminants. The intestine is unusually long, even compared to those of other langurs, and has a number of pouches along its length, which carry out further fermentation of plant matter. The teeth have grinding ridges and other modifications to allow the more efficient processing of tough leaves.

Distribution and habitat
The silvery lutung is found across Borneo and Sumatra, as well as in parts of the south-western Malay peninsula, the Natuna Islands, and other nearby islands. It inhabits mangrove swamps and nearby forest regions, and generally avoids travelling far from coasts or rivers.

The number and identity of subspecies of the silvery lutung is currently debated. A 2008 analysis confirms the presence of only two subspecies:

 Trachypithecus cristatus cristatus - Borneo, Sumatra, Natuna Islands
 Trachypithecus cristatus selangorensis - Malay Peninsula

The Malay Peninsula form has been subsequently elevated to a separate species, the Selangor silvered langur T. selangorensis

However, some older sources, such as Mammal Species of the World, as well as some much newer ones such as the 2021 edition of the IUCN Red List, distinguish the silvery lutungs of the Natuna Islands as a separate subspecies, designated T. c. vigilans.

Ecology

Diet 
The silvery lutung is a specialist folivore, including a higher proportion of leaves in its diet than any other colobine monkey. Although it does also eat fruit, and some seeds and flowers, these comprise only 9% of the diet, and it is also able to feed on tougher and more mature leaves than any of its close relatives. Because of these differences, silvery lutungs do not normally live in the same parts of the forest as other monkeys. Where other species are found in the same area, silvery lutungs are more commonly found in the middle canopy of the forest, leaving the higher branches to monkeys with a more frugivorous diet.

Predators 
Local predators able to feed on silvery lutungs include leopards, tigers, dholes, and some large snakes. Binturongs, and various other small carnivores are probably able to feed on infants.

Diseases 
Silvery lutungs are unusually susceptible to human diseases, including AIDS, and have therefore been widely used in medical research.

Behaviour

Silvery lutungs are diurnal, and travel in groups of around 9-40 individuals with one adult male and many adult females communally caring for infants. They rarely leave the trees, which provide them protection from ground-dwelling predators, and rapidly flee if threatened. During the day, individuals may travel up to  through the forest, with some forming all-female subgroups that separate from the group containing the male. The entire group shelters in a single tree at night.

The social structure of silvery lutungs is matrilineal and harem based. Females remain in the group for life, while males leave shortly after reaching adulthood, living in small groups of their own until they can take over an established harem. Within the group, males dominate the females, and females with young dominate those without. However, there is relatively little aggression within the group compared with some related species.

Because group ranges often overlap, different groups frequently come into contact with one another. The adult male protects his group and territory from competing males, communicating his dominance to other males via vocalizations and fighting. In the absence of males, however, females from different groups are more likely to interact peacefully. The most serious conflicts occur when a male intrudes directly on the territory of another male, which may result in the intruder displacing the resident and taking control of the group. In many other primates, such a displacement would normally be followed by the male killing any infants sired by his predecessor; although this may occur in silvery lutungs, it has not been directly observed, and may be less common than in some other species.

Although less vocal than other closely related species, silvery lutungs make at least thirteen different vocalisations, with the most common being used by adult males defending their territory. Other vocalisations express fear, anger, excitement, and satisfaction, in addition to various calls made by infants.

In Sabah, Malaysia, silvery lutungs have been observed in mixed-species groups with proboscis monkeys, and interspecific mating and a possible hybrid has been observed.  Researchers believe this may be a result of the two species being confined to a small patch of riverine forest due to deforestation in order to plant oil palm trees.

Reproduction

Silvery lutungs breed year round, with no clear breeding season, although each female typically gives birth no more than once every 18 to 24 months. The female attracts the male by making side-to-side motions with her head, and copulation may occur several times during a bout. Unusually, females have been reported to reach menopause in the wild, and may survive up to nine years after last giving birth.

The female gives birth to a single young after a gestation period of 181 to 200 days. Silvery lutungs are born with orange fur, and with white hairless skin on the face, hands, and feet. The skin rapidly changes to the dark adult colour, but the fur does not reach the adult pattern for three to five months after birth. The young are cared for by females communally, and are not weaned for 18 months, even though the biological mother stops lactating after just 12 months. The young are sexually mature almost as soon as they finish weaning, and, on average, females first give birth at 35 months of age.

Silvery lutungs have lived up to 31 years in captivity.

Evolution
Genetic analysis has shown that the silvery lutung probably first evolved during a rapid speciation event that occurred between 0.95 and 1.25 million years ago, during which all the living species of the T. cristatus species group evolved. Because of the relative speed and diversity of this event, the species of the group are difficult to distinguish genetically, and there is some uncertainty as to which represent genuinely distinct species. However, the closest living relative of the silvery lutung may be the Javan lutung, although silvery lutungs have also been reported to produce hybrids with Phayre's leaf monkey, generally considered to belong to a different species group.

Fossils of the species are known from the late Pleistocene onwards, and occupy the same geographic range as today. Some of these fossils had significantly larger cheek teeth than living animals, although they have not been assigned to a distinct subspecies.

Conservation
The silvery lutung is classed as vulnerable by the IUCN, and is listed in Appendix II of CITES. Its habitat is heavily threatened throughout its range by logging and the development of oil plantations. The species is also threatened by hunting for meat and by capture for the pet trade.

References

External links

BBC: Silvered Langur
  Lotong Kelabu

silvery lutung
Primates of Southeast Asia
Mammals of Indonesia
Mammals of Malaysia
Mammals of Borneo
Near threatened animals
Near threatened biota of Asia
silvery lutung
Taxa named by Thomas Stamford Raffles